Sportiva Nervi is an Italian water polo club from Nervi (Genoa) in Liguria founded in 1932.

History 
Sportiva Nervi was founded in 1932 as Dopolavoro Caprafico. The men's team of Sportiva Nervi competed for the first time in Serie A from the season 1957.
The club competed in Serie A until 1963.
In those years, athletes of great technical value play in the Sportiva Nervi such as goalkeeper Dante Rossi, who participated at 1960 Summer Olympics in Rome, winning the gold medal with the Italy men's national water polo team.
The club achieved its best results in Serie A from 1967 to 1969, obtaining 3 consecutive runners-up behind the Pro Recco. The men's team of Sportiva Nervi competed in Serie A until 1983 then in the following season competed in Serie A2.

Honours

 Men
  Italian League
 Runners-up (3): 1967, 1968, 1969
 Third Place (3): 1966, 1970, 1973
 Coppa Italia
 Third Place (1): 2005
 Italian Championship Under-20 Serie B (Nord)
 Winners (1): 1990
 Italian Championship Under-17 A
 Winners (7): 1962, 1971, 1974, 1975, 1982, 1983, 1994
 Italian Championship Under-15
 Winners (1): 2005
 Italian Championship Under-20
 Winners (8): 1952, 1959, 1963, 1971, 1974, 1977, 1978, 2011

Current team

Famous players
 Dante Rossi
 Milivoj Bebić
 Merrill Moses

Famous coaches
 Massimiliano Ferretti

References

External links
 Official site

Water polo clubs in Liguria
Water polo clubs in Italy
Sport in Genoa
Sports clubs established in 1932
Nervi